Al Smith ran for President of the United States multiple times, unsuccessfully.

 Al Smith 1920 presidential campaign; see 1920 Democratic National Convention
 Al Smith 1924 presidential campaign
 Al Smith 1928 presidential campaign
 Al Smith 1932 presidential campaign